The following is an alphabetical list of topics related to Venezuela.

0–9

.ve – Internet country code top-level domain for Venezuela

A
Amazonas State, Venezuela
Americas
South America
Islands of Venezuela
North Atlantic Ocean
Mar Caribe (Caribbean Sea)
Golfo de Venezuela (Gulf of Venezuela)
Angostura
Añu
Apure
Araguaney
Angel Falls
Amazon biome
Amazon rainforest
Atlas of Venezuela

B
Barinas
Bolivarian Republic of Venezuela (República Bolivariana de Venezuela)

C
Capital of Venezuela:  Santiago de León de Caracas (Caracas)
Caracas (Santiago de León de Caracas) – Capital of Venezuela since 1777
Caribbean
Caribbean Community (CARICOM)
Caribbean Sea
Categories:
:Category:Venezuela
:Category:Buildings and structures in Venezuela
:Category:Communications in Venezuela
:Category:Economy of Venezuela
:Category:Education in Venezuela
:Category:Environment of Venezuela
:Category:Films set in Venezuela
:Category:Geography of Venezuela
:Category:Government of Venezuela
:Category:Health in Venezuela
:Category:History of Venezuela
:Category:Images of Venezuela
:Category:Law of Venezuela
:Category:Military of Venezuela
:Category:Politics of Venezuela
:Category:Science and technology in Venezuela
:Category:Society of Venezuela
:Category:Sport in Venezuela
:Category:Transport in Venezuela
:Category:Venezuela stubs
:Category:Venezuelan culture
:Category:Venezuelan people
:Category:Venezuela-related lists
commons:Category:Venezuela
Coat of arms of Venezuela
Congress of Angostura
Constitution of Venezuela
Culture of Venezuela
Currency of Venezuela
Cuisine of Venezuela

D
Defensoría del Pueblo (Venezuela)
Demographics of Venezuela
Diplomatic missions of Venezuela

E
Economy of Venezuela
Essequibo River

F

Flag of Venezuela
Foreign relations of Venezuela

G
"Gloria al Bravo Pueblo"
Golfo de Venezuela
Guajira Peninsula
Gulf of Venezuela
Geography of Venezuela
Government of Venezuela

H
Hugo Chávez

I
International Organization for Standardization (ISO)
ISO 3166-1 alpha-2 country code for Venezuela: VE
ISO 3166-1 alpha-3 country code for Venezuela: VEN
ISO 3166-2:VE region codes for Venezuela
Islands of Venezuela:
Blanquilla Island
Isla Aves
Isla de Coche
Isla de Cubagua
Isla de Patos
Isla Margarita
Islas Los Frailes
La Orchila
La Sola Island
La Tortuga Island
Las Aves Archipelago
Los Hermanos Archipelago
Los Monjes Archipelago
Los Roques Archipelago
Los Testigos Islands

J

K

L
La Guaira Bank
Lake Maracaibo
Latin America
Lists related to Venezuela:
Diplomatic missions of Venezuela
List of anthems of Venezuela
List of companies of Venezuela
List of diplomatic missions in Venezuela
List of earthquakes in Venezuela
List of football stadiums in Venezuela
List of governors of Aragua
List of governors of Bolívar
List of governors of Guárico
List of governors of Monagas
List of governors of Vargas
List of Guarenas / Guatire metro stations
List of islands of Venezuela
List of newspapers in Venezuela
List of players from Venezuela in Major League Baseball
List of political parties in Venezuela
List of presidents and governors of Zulia
List of presidents of Venezuela
List of state trees of Venezuela
List of Venezuela governors
List of Venezuelan artists
List of Venezuelan writers
List of Venezuela-related topics
Lists of Venezuelans
Ranked list of Venezuelan states
Television in Venezuela

M
Manuel Cabré
Mar Caribe
Media of Venezuela
Miss Venezuela
Monagas
Music of Venezuela

N
National anthem of Venezuela

O
Orinoco
Outline of Venezuela

P
Palafitos
Carlos Andrés Pérez
Public Ministry of Venezuela

Q

R
República Bolivariana de Venezuela (Bolivarian Republic of Venezuela)
Cristóbal Rojas

S
Santiago de León de Caracas (Caracas) – Capital of Venezuela since 1777
Se llamaba SN 
Shabono
Simón Bolívar
Spanish colonization of the Americas
Spanish language
States of Venezuela
Ranked list of Venezuelan states

T
Tabebuia
Television in Venezuela
Transportation in Venezuela
Tinaquillo

U
United Nations founding member state 1945
Arturo Uslar Pietri

V
Venezuela
Venezuelan War of Independence
Venezuela (song)

W
Water supply and sanitation in Venezuela

Wikipedia:WikiProject Topic outline/Drafts/Outline of Venezuela

X

Y

Z
Zulia

See also

List of international rankings
Lists of country-related topics
Outline of geography
Outline of South America
Outline of Venezuela
United Nations

External links

 
Venezuela